Taenioides buchanani, the Burmese gobyeel, is a species of goby found in the Indian Ocean along the east coast of India, Bangladesh and Myanmar. This species can reach a length of  TL.

Etymology
The gobyeel is named in honor of Francis Hamilton-Buchanan (1762-1829), a Scottish physician and naturalist, who published an account of Indo-Gangetic fishes in 1822.

References

Talwar, P.K. and A.G. Jhingran, 1991. Inland fishes of India and adjacent countries. Volume 2. A.A. Balkema, Rotterdam.

buchanani
Taxa named by Francis Day
Fish described in 1873